Constitution of 1952 may refer to:

Constitution of Hamburg of 1952
Constitution of Poland of 1952
Constitution of Romania of 1952
Constitution of Uruguay of 1952